This article is a list of diseases of pecans (Carya illinoinensis).

Bacterial diseases

Fungal diseases

Nematodes, parasitic

Phytoplasmal diseases

Virus diseases
Pecan mosaic-associated virus, potyvirus

Miscellaneous diseases and disorders

References 

 Common Names of Diseases, The American Phytopathological Society

Pecan
pecan
Diseases